Muhamad Salleh bin Perang (1841 – 21 July 1915) was a Malay statesman, traveller, and military leader who served in the administration of the independent kingdom of Johor from 1856 to 1912, today part of Malaysia. Carrying the title of Dato Bentara Luar, he was in charge of establishing new towns and settlements in Johor, as well as surveying and mapping its territories. He also accompanied Sultan Abu Bakar on the latter's official visit to Meiji Japan in 1883, recording his impressions in the Tarikh Dato' Bentara Luar, published in 1928.

Map making and development tasks
Salleh was a bureaucrat whose duty was to manage and develop lands and taking care of gambir and black pepper plantations. As the Head of the Land Management and State Survey, he successfully drew a complete map of Johor with Jawi legends. It was the first complete map that was plotted for a state in the Malay Peninsula.

This information was then used to plan the development of Johor State. The map showed all the roads and cities that were planned for development during his tenure. The map also shows geographical details for most of the district of Johore.

Salleh was involved in the development and planning of the cities of Bandar Maharani (1888) and Batu Pahat (1893).

Salleh was a Malay . But his ability to converse in Chinese and his knowledge of Chinese culture made him close to  the Chinese people brought in by the Kangchu system. In the 1880s, he accompanied the Sultan on a visit to China and Japan. He started off as the commissioner of the State Police and ended up as member of State Legislature and Cabinet.

Batu Pahat 
Batu Pahat was a small town situated in the Simpang Kanan area, roughly seven miles from the Sungai Batu Pahat river.

On 11 November 1893, Sultan Abu Bakar of Johor instructed Salleh to begin development of Batu Pahat into a city. He started by preparing roads, government departments, and a modern town administration system.

The official opening of Batu Pahat was held on 1 January 1894 by Salleh and attended by important dignitaries, influential people, and chiefs of nearby villages. The city prospered under him as the Sultan's representative governor. He later became commissioner and encouraged villagers to develop farms and irrigation works. At the same time, foreign investors opened businesses in Batu Pahat. Salleh's contributions were recognized by Ungku Sulaiman bin Daud, the chief commissioner of Johor, during his official visit on 21 December 1896.

Retirement 
The death of Sultan Abu Bakar of Johor led the British government to increase their influence in the Johor government. Slowly, the district officials throughout Johor, capable Malays in administration and development posts, including Muhammad Salleh Perang himself, were replaced.

On 3 April 1909, Salleh received a letter from Dato' Seri Amar Di Raja Abdul Rahman Andak asking him to retire from his post. All his life, he had shown his loyalty to the Sultan and proved that he was able to execute his responsibilities with his own effort. The Dato' Bentara Luar accused him of treason but no strong evidence was found. On 21 May 1912, Salleh resigned at the age of 71. He was replaced by Ungku Ahmad bin Ungku Muhammad Khalid as the commissioner of Batu Pahat. Under him, the Malay district commissioner was jointly responsible with the British commissioner for administration.

Death 
He died on 21 July 1915 (18 Sya'aban 1333) and was buried at Mahmoodiah Royal Mausoleum in Johor Bahru, Johor.

References

 Laman web Perpustakaan Negara Malaysia
 Warisan Dato' Bentara Luar Johor
 Reputations Live On: An Early Malay Autobiography, by Amin Sweeney. Berkeley: University of California Press, 1980. 

1841 births
1915 deaths
History of Johor
People from Johor
People from British Malaya
Knights Grand Commander of the Order of the Crown of Johor